Bab Tangal (also Romanized as Bāb Tangal; also known as Bāb-e Tangal Qadamgāh, Bāb Tangal-e ‘Olyā, Bāb Tangal-e Qadamgāh, Bab Tankal Ghadamgah, Dareh-e Tangal, Dar Tangal (Persian: درتنگل), Dar Tangal-e Qadamgāh, and Dar Tangol) is a village in Vahdat Rural District, in the Central District of Zarand County, Kerman Province, Iran. At the 2006 census, its population was 1,839, in 449 families.

References 

Populated places in Zarand County